The Philosophicum Lech is a philosophical symposium in Lech am Arlberg in Vorarlberg (Austria). It has been established for the philosophical, cultural and social science reflection, discussion and encounter.

History 
The idea for a philosophical exchange in Lech arose in a conversation between Mayor Ludwig Muxel and the Vorarlberg writer Michael Köhlmeier. Austrian philosopher Konrad Paul Liessmann was appointed to be the scientific director.

For his efforts to convey scientific work to a broad population, Konrad Paul Liessmann was named “Scientist of the Year 2006” by education and science journalists.

In 1997, the first Philosophicum Lech took place in which around 100 visitors participated. In more recent years, the event counted more than 600 participants.

Venue 
The first event location was the hotel “Die Krone von Lech”. Over 100 people interested in philosophy gathered. From then on, the symposium enjoyed steadily increasing audience numbers, which is why it moved to the “Fux-Restaurant + Bar + Kultur” in 1999 due to a lack of space. There, too, capacity limits were soon reached, with the result that the Philosophicum Lech was held twice in the "Lech Postgarage" from 2003 before it found its current destination in Lech's new church.

Tractatus – the award for philosophical essay writing 
In 2009, the Tractatus was introduced. It is a prize for scientific prose or philosophical essay writing endowed with a prize money of 25.000€. The award is given to outstanding German-language publications that discuss philosophical questions in the broader sense. In an ambitious yet understandable way, the author should analyse central topics of the time and develop new perspectives on them, thus making an overall contribution to a high-quality debate of public interest.

Even though the 2020 edition of the event did not take place, the essay prize Tractatus was awarded nevertheless. The 2020 Tractatus winner is Roberto Simanowski for his book on artificial intelligence.

Timeline 
The following subjects were chosen for their respective event year:

See also 

 Medicinicum Lech
Literaricum Lech
 reddit essay writing service

References

External links 

 Official website (in German)

Vorarlberg
Academic conferences
Annual events in Austria